Sundasciurus robinsoni, or Robinson's squirrel, is a species of rodent in the family Sciuridae. It is found in Indonesia, Malaysia and Thailand. The species Sundasciurus robinsoni has a dorsum that ranges from medium brown with orange agouti to dark brown (S. r. vanakeni), and its venter ranges from white to pale yellow/buff white, with a reduction in the extent of this pale coloration and a lack of distinct margins in the case of S. r. vanakeni. Some populations (S. r. balae and S. r. vanakeni) have a grayish ventral coloration in limbs while others do not (S. r. robinsoni). It can be easily distinguished from other medium-sized western Sundaland Sundasciurus based on its ventral coloration and tail. All populations of S. fraterculus except Siberut, S. tahan, and S. altitudinis have a venter fur coloration homogeneously admixed with gray. The only other medium sized squirrel found in syntopy, S. tenuis, is also usually ventrally darker (admixed with gray) and dorsally lighter, with reddish-brown coloration on the shoulders and hips, white/pallid yellow hair tips present on tail, and a relatively thinner and longer tail (85–95% of head-body length; than S. robinsoni (56–84% of head-body length). Males of S. fraterculus, S. tahan and S. tenuis have a darker orange wash in the scrotal area than S. robinsoni, which is peach colored.

References

External links
  - Entry on MammalDiversity.org

Sundasciurus
Rodents of Indonesia
Rodents of Malaysia
Rodents of Thailand
Mammals described in 1902